Huobutaqi Station is a station on Line 1 of the Hohhot Metro. It opened on 29 December 2019.

Houbutaqi Station is named after the nearby Houbutaqi Village. The village was established during the Qing Dynasty and is named after the local bushes. Houbutaqi is the final subterranean station eastbound, with trains surfacing between Houbutaqi and Shilandai station.

References

Hohhot Metro stations
Railway stations in China opened in 2019